Muharrem Sahiti (born 10 May 1965) is a Kosovan professional football coach and former player who is the current sports director of Kosovo national team.

Club career
Sahiti at the age of 17, he started playing football in Crvena Zvezda Gjilane, where after three years he was promoted to the senior team and appeared 32 times and scored 12 goals. One year later after good performances with Crvena Zvezda Gjilane, he was transferred to Yugoslav First League club Prishtina and appeared 43 times and scored 13 goals, but after the situation in Kosovo deteriorated in 1990, he was transferred to Süper Lig club Konyaspor and appeared 43 times and scored 13 goals. He besides being was part of Konyaspor, he was part even of Lokomotiv Plovdiv (1992–1997), Thun (1997–1998) and Oberneuland (1998–1999). While, in the last three years of his career he returned to his former team, Gjilani and in the 1999–2000 season won the Cup and the Supercup.

International career
On 1 February 1993, Sahiti received a call-up from Kosovo for a friendly match against Albania, and made his debut after being named in the starting line-up.

Managerial career

Kosovo

Second term as caretaker
On 1 November 2017, The Football Federation of Kosovo appointed Sahiti as caretaker manager. On 8 November 2017, he made his first squad announcement with Kosovo for the friendly match against Latvia and he brought three new players as Armend Thaqi, Faton Maloku and Suad Sahiti. On 13 November 2017, he made his first match as Kosovo manager with a 4–3 home win against Latvia.

Career statistics

Managerial

Notes and references

Notes

References

External links

1965 births
Living people
People from Viti, Kosovo
Kosovan footballers
Kosovo pre-2014 international footballers
Kosovan expatriate footballers
Expatriate footballers in Turkey
Kosovan expatriate sportspeople in Turkey
Expatriate footballers in Bulgaria
Kosovan expatriate sportspeople in Bulgaria
Expatriate footballers in Switzerland
Kosovan expatriate sportspeople in Switzerland
Expatriate footballers in Germany
Kosovan expatriate sportspeople in Germany
Association football midfielders
Football Superleague of Kosovo players
SC Gjilani players
Yugoslav First League players
Yugoslav Second League players
FC Prishtina players
Süper Lig players
Konyaspor footballers
First Professional Football League (Bulgaria) players
PFC Lokomotiv Plovdiv players
Swiss Challenge League players
FC Thun players
Oberliga (football) players
FC Oberneuland players
Kosovan football managers
SC Gjilani managers
FC Drita managers
Kosovo national football team managers